Gouldii, a word referring to English naturalist John Gould (1804–1881), may refer to:

 A. gouldii
 Achoerodus gouldii, the Western blue groper, a fish species in the genus Achoerodus
 E. gouldii
 Elaps gouldii, a snake species in the genus Elaps
 R. gouldii
 Ristantia gouldii, a plant species in the genus Ristantia

Subspecies 
 Zosterops lateralis gouldii, the grey-breasted white-eye or the western silvereye, a bird subspecies found in Western Australia and South Australia

See also 
 Gould (name)
 gouldiae
 gouldi (disambiguation)